Nushabad is a city in Isfahan Province, Iran.

Nushabad may also refer to:

Nushabad, Rafsanjan, Kerman Province
Nushabad, Lorestan
Nushabad, Sistan and Baluchestan